Robert G. Rich Jr. (born November 15, 1930) is an American former diplomat who served as the Ambassador to Belize.

Rich was born in Gainesville, Florida on November 15, 1930. He graduated from the University of Florida in 1952 and served in the United States Navy, 1952 - 1954. After serving in the Navy, he attended “Cornell University as a candidate in the graduate school in cultural anthropology and Asian Studies.” Rich joined the Foreign Service in 1957 after working as a junior research engineer at Sperry Corporation.

Rich would take on the following assignments:
State Department - Department Secretariat 1957-1959 
South Korea - Political Officer 1959-1962 
Indonesia - Principal Officer 1962-1963
State Department - Deputy Director, Operations Center 1967-1971
Trinidad - Deputy Chief of Mission 1971-1977 
State Department - Korea Desk 1977-1981
State Department - Senior Seminar 1981-1982
Philippines - Deputy Chief of Mission 1982-1986
Belize - Ambassador 1987-1990 
Atlanta University Center - Ambassador-in-Residence 1990-1991

When Philippine President Ferdinand Marcos was deposed in 1986 after a 20-year dictatorship, he and 90 other members of his entourage found themselves in exile in Hawaii.  Robert Rich was assigned by the State Department as the minder of the Marcoses, as the deposed leader demanded a direct line with Pres. Ronald Reagan.

References

1930 births
Living people
Ambassadors of the United States to Belize
Cornell University alumni
Military personnel from Florida
People from Gainesville, Florida
University of Florida alumni